Agasthyagama beddomii, commonly known as the Indian kangaroo lizard, is a diurnal, terrestrial, insectivorous agamid lizard, endemic to the Western Ghats of South India.

Etymology
The specific name, beddomii, is in honor of British army officer and botanist Richard Henry Beddome (1830–1911).

The common name, Indian kangaroo lizard, is derived from the lizard's habit of running on its hind legs with the body held upright.

Geographic range
A. beddomii is endemic to Western Ghats, where it is known from Sivagiri Hills (type locality), Agasthyamalai, Cardamom Hills and Travancore hills in Tamil Nadu and Kerala states.

Description

The head is covered in scales that have a sharp keel running along the centre, a feature also found in the Sri Lankan species (O. nigristigma and O. wiegmanni ). The scales on the head between the eyes are smaller and form about two or three longitudinal series. An inverted Y shape is formed by the keels of the scales but is indistinct. The canthus rostralis (or snout) is not prominent. There are 9 or 10 scales on the upper and lower lip. There are small pits on each side of the neck and in front of the shoulder. The scales on the back are unequal in size with the larger ones forming regular V-shaped marks with the point facing backwards, enlarged ones sometimes forming regular chevrons on the back, with the point facing backward. The scales on the underside are larger than those above. The scales on the side are small but with large scales interspersed. The scales on the upper side of the legs are large and keeled. When the hind leg is held along the body, the tip of the foot reaches the snout, the heel reaching the ear opening. The tail is round and slender and about two times the length of the head and body. The tail is covered by strongly keeled scales. The colour is olive brown with patches of dark brown on the back and limbs. A dark oblique band runs below the eye to the mouth. The underside is whitish, and young lizards have a brown throat.

Habitat
The preferred habitat of A. beddomii is moist leaf litter on the forest floor of both evergreen and deciduous forests, but it may also climb onto low tree trunks and shrubs.

Reproduction
A. beddomii is an oviparous species, with adult females laying clutches of 3–5 eggs.

Conservation status
The distribution of A. beddomii is highly fragmented in patches of dense forest in the Western Ghats from and south of the Shencottah Gap. The species appears to be sensitive to human disturbance. A record from Kodaikanal has been considered to be in error.

References

Further reading
Boulenger GA (1890). The Fauna of British India, Including Ceylon and Burma. Reptilia and Batrachia. London: Secretary of State for India in Council. (Taylor and Francis, printers). xviii + 541 pp. (Otocryptis beddomii, p. 116).
Smith MA (1935). The Fauna of British India, Including Ceylon and Burma. Reptilia and Amphibia. Vol. II.—Sauria. London: Secretary of State for India in Council. (Taylor and Francis, printers). xiii + 440 pp. + Plate I + 2 maps. (Otocryptis beddomii, pp. 147–148, Figure 44).

External links

Agamidae
Reptiles of India
Endemic fauna of the Western Ghats
Reptiles described in 1885
Taxa named by George Albert Boulenger